H. A. Moyer Automobile Company (1908–1915), a manufacturer of luxury automobiles in Syracuse, New York, was founded by Harvey A. Moyer (1853–1935) of Clay, New York.

History 
The company began business in 1876 in Cicero, New York, as H. A. Moyer Carriage Company. As the era of the horse-drawn carriage came to an end, Moyer switched assembly to motor vehicles, although he continued to produce carriages.

Moyer built large cars in the luxury $2,000 to $3,000 range. His engines had full-pressure lubrication and both four-cylinder and six-cylinder versions were available.  Moyer intended to introduce a less expensive version for the 1916 model year, but he ran out of capital funds.  By the end of 1915 he discontinued his automobile business, after the production of about 400 cars.

In 1916 Moyer incorporated as H. A. Moyer, Inc., and became a dealer for Stearns-Knight and Velie automobiles.

Gallery

References

External links
The Moyer Ward Legacy (series of videos) - Peter Forgan, 2010
H. A. Moyer USA 1915 supreme speed 80 km /h
Penfield Building, Former Moyer Carriage Factory, Syracuse, NY
H. A. Moyer Designer builder, high grade carriages, 1909

Motor vehicle manufacturers based in Syracuse, New York
Defunct motor vehicle manufacturers of the United States
Vehicle manufacturing companies disestablished in 1915
1915 disestablishments in New York (state)
Defunct companies based in Syracuse, New York
Motor vehicle manufacturers based in New York (state)
Luxury vehicles
Luxury motor vehicle manufacturers
Brass Era vehicles
1910s cars
Cars introduced in 1911
Vehicle manufacturing companies established in 1911